Lake Waccamaw State Park is a North Carolina state park in Columbus County, North Carolina, in the United States. Recent work by the U.S. Geological Survey has interpreted the Carolina Bays as relict thermokarst lakes that formed several thousands of years ago when the climate was colder, drier, and windier. Thermokarst lakes develop by thawing of frozen ground (permafrost) and by subsequent modification by wind and water. Thus, this interpretation suggests that permafrost once extended as far south as the Carolina Bays during the last ice age and (or) previous ice ages.

Lake Waccamaw State Park is located in North Carolina's Coastal Plain.

References

External links

 

1976 establishments in North Carolina
Protected areas established in 1976
Protected areas of Columbus County, North Carolina
State parks of North Carolina